Dolní Rožínka is a municipality and village in Žďár nad Sázavou District in the Vysočina Region of the Czech Republic. It has about 600 inhabitants.

Administrative parts
The village of Horní Rozsíčka is an administrative part of Dolní Rožínka.

Economy
The last uranium mine in the country was located here until 2016, when it was closed.

References

Villages in Žďár nad Sázavou District